On the Front Line may refer to:
On the Front Line (The Casualties album), 2004
On the Front Line (Dan Seals album), 1986